Wesley Darcel Walker (born May 26, 1955) is an American former professional football player who was a wide receiver for the New York Jets  of the National Football League (NFL) from 1977 to 1989.

Walker graduated from Carson High School in Carson, California, where he set many receiving and return records, and was an All-American for the  California Golden Bears, catching 86 passes for 2,206 yards and 22 touchdowns over the course of four seasons, an average of 25.7 yards per catch.

He was noted for his great speed, averaging over 20 yards per reception over many seasons (his career average was 19 yards per reception). At the time of his retirement, he was second in Jets all-time receiving yardage. Legally blind in his left eye, Walker overcame this handicap to become one of the Jets all-time great receivers.

Connie Carberg, the first female scout in NFL history was credited with helping the Jets in their selection of Walker in the second round of the 1977 NFL Draft.

He led the league in receiving yards in 1978, was elected to the Pro Bowl twice 1978 and 1982, and was named the New York Jets MVP in 1978.

Walker was one of the dominant players in the 1982 NFL Playoffs: in two postseason games, he caught 15 passes for 314 yards and 2 touchdowns, as the Jets beat the Cincinnati Bengals and the Los Angeles Raiders, both on the road.

His best receiving season came in 1983, when he caught 61 receptions; and in 1986 he had a career-best 12 receiving touchdowns. Four of them were scored in week three, as he caught a game-winning touchdown from the Jets quarterback Ken O'Brien in overtime to give the Jets a wild shootout win 51-45 over the Miami Dolphins.

When he retired, he had caught 438 passes for 8,306 yards and 71 touchdowns.

Walker is now a retired physical education teacher at Park View Elementary School in Kings Park, New York, and an occasional sports radio show commentator. He has two sons and a daughter. His older son, John, was a 3x All-American lacrosse player at The United States Military Academy at West Point. His younger son, Austin, played lacrosse at Johns Hopkins University. He is also the godfather of Alexandra Florant, the daughter of the track and field star Carl Florant.

Like many former NFL players, Walker suffers from a variety of ailments as a direct result from his playing days, which he detailed in a revealing 2016 interview with Long Island Pulse Magazine. He graduated from Mercy College.

Walker was inducted into the Suffolk Sports Hall of Fame on Long Island in the Football Category with the Class of 2000.

References

External links
Wesley Walker Statistics
2016 Wesley Walker Interview With Long Island Pulse

1955 births
Living people
Sportspeople from San Bernardino, California
African-American players of American football
American blind people
Schoolteachers from New York (state)
Sportspeople from Los Angeles County, California
American football wide receivers
California Golden Bears football players
New York Jets players
American Conference Pro Bowl players
People from Carson, California
Players of American football from California
Mercy College (New York) alumni
Carson High School (Carson, California) alumni
21st-century African-American people
20th-century African-American sportspeople